Brian Leeds (born April 20, 1991), better known by the pseudonyms Pendant, Huerco S., Loidis, and Royal Crown of Sweden, is an American independent electronic musician. He is considered a pioneer in the genre of outsider house, a more experimental and lo-fi form of deep house. His recent work has abandoned outsider house in favour of an ambient sound. His music has received attention from, among others, The Fader, FACT Magazine and Tiny Mix Tapes, the latter of whom awarded his 2018 album Make Me Know You Sweet with the "Eureka!" rating of 4 out of 5.

Discography

As Huerco S.

Albums
Colonial Patterns (2013)
For Those of You Who Have Never (And Also Those Who Have) (2016)
Plonk (2022)

EPs
HRCS-001 (2011)
Untitled (2012)
No Jack (2012)
Apheleia's Theme (2013)
A Verdigris Reader (2014)
Railroad Blues (2015)

Limited editions
Quiet Time (2016)

As Pendant

Albums
Make Me Know You Sweet (2018)
To All Sides They Will Stretch Out Their Hands (2021)

As Royal Crown of Sweden

EPs
R.E.G.A.L.I.E.R. (2013)

As Loidis

EPs
A Parade, In The Place I Sit, The Floating World (& All Its Pleasures) (2018)

References

External links
Official site

Living people
Ambient musicians
American experimental musicians
American house musicians
Outsider house musicians
People from Emporia, Kansas
1991 births
Tiny Engines artists